Hassaïne may refer to:

 El Hassaine, a town and commune in Mostaganem Province, Algeria
 Mohamed Hassaïne (1945–1994), an Algerian journalist

Arabic-language surnames